Vuokko Hillevi Lilian Eskolin-Nurmesniemi (born 12 February 1930 in Helsinki) is a Finnish textile designer. She is best known for her work as one of the two leading designers of the Marimekko company. Her signature striped Jokapoika shirt helped to make the company's name.

Biography
Eskolin-Nurmesniemi studied ceramics at the Institute of Industrial Arts (in Finnish: Taideteollinen oppilaitos) in Helsinki, Finland. After graduating, she designed glassware and ceramics for Arabia and Nuutajärvi. In 1957, she received a gold medal at the Milan Triennial XI for her glassware.

Eskolin-Nurmesniemi joined the Finnish company Marimekko in 1953. She designed patterns for many of their printed fabrics in the 1950s; together with Maija Isola, she was responsible for most of Marimekko's patterns. Nurmesniemi's signature product was a simply striped red and white shirt named Jokapoika, in 1956; she went on to create a large number of striking designs.

Nurmesniemi left Marimekko in 1960 due to conflicts with Marimekko founder Armi Ratia. She founded her own company, Vuokko Oy, in 1964, and designed textiles as well as ready-to-wear clothing and accessories. This company closed its doors in 1988. In 1990 Nurmesniemi founded a second company, Vuokko Nurmesniemi Oy.

She received the Milan Triennale XI in 1957 and Milan Triennial XIII grand prix in 1964, the Lunning Prize for design in 1964, the Prince Eugen Medal in 1986 and the Kaj Franck Design Prize in 1997.

She was married to designer Antti Nurmesniemi until his death in 2003.

Museums and exhibitions

Nurmesniemi's designs are in the permanent collection at the Metropolitan Museum of Art and the Victoria and Albert Museum.

In the summer of 2009, the Röhsska museum in Gothenburg, Sweden, held an exhibition of her designs.

Reception
Ted Hesselbom of the Swedish Röhsska Museum wrote of Vuokko's Retrospective in 2009:

Bibliography
 Jackson, Lesley. Twentieth Century Pattern Design. Princeton Architectural Press, 2007.

References

External links
 US.Marimekko.com: Vuokko Eskolin-Nurmesniemi
 Metropolitan Museum of Art: Vuokko Eskolin-Nurmesniemi (images of Vuokko designs)

1930 births
Living people
Artists from Helsinki
Finnish designers
Textile designers
Finnish fashion designers
Finnish women fashion designers
Recipients of the Prince Eugen Medal